Livədirgə (also, Livədirqə, Leva-Dyr’gya, and Livadirgya) is a village and municipality in the Lerik Rayon of Azerbaijan. It has a population of 1,137. The municipality consists of the villages of Livədirgə and Yuxarı Bilnə.

References 

Populated places in Lerik District